Mayen Adetiba (born 1954) is a Nigerian actress and civil engineer.

Life
Adetiba was born in 1954 in Nigeria. She initially wanted to be an accountant, but she then got interested in journalism.

She worked on The Bar Beach Show and she was Lakunle Ojo's wife in the Village Headmaster. She was in Kongi's Harvest which went out in 1980. She went to the US for her university education where she had to work as her parents could not send her money because of export restrictions. She was briefly at New York University before she transferred to Columbia University studying electrical engineering. She was told that civil engineering may be more appreciated in Africa so she decided to switch disciplines.

When she switched to study Civil Engineering at Columbia University she was not just the only Nigerian, but also the only black girl on the course. She went on to take her master's degree at Cornell University.

She married Dele Adetiba and their daughter Kemi was born in Lagos in January 1980.

She was elected President of the Association of Consulting Engineers of Nigeria and she was Vice-President of the Nigerian Society of Engineers on three occasions. She was the first woman be elected to the Executive Committee of the Nigerian Society of Engineers. Her career including working on the African Union Southern Africa Regional Office which is in Malawi and on the huge Summerhill Baptist Church in Lagos. She worked on the latter pro bono.

In 2017 she was chosen to be on her daughter's show "King Women" where she was interviewed by Kemi Adetiba. She joined other former "King Women" including Chigul, Taiwo Ajai-Lycett, TY Bello and Tara Durotoye

References 

1954 births
Living people
Nigerian civil engineers
Nigerian women engineers
Cornell University alumni
Columbia School of Engineering and Applied Science  alumni
New York University alumni
20th-century Nigerian actresses
Nigerian film actresses
Nigerian television actresses
21st-century Nigerian actresses
Nigerian television personalities
Nigerian media personalities